Henk Breitner (3 April 1907 – 13 April 1976) was a Dutch footballer. He played in five matches for the Netherlands national football team from 1930 to 1933.

References

External links
 

1907 births
1976 deaths
Dutch footballers
Netherlands international footballers
Footballers from The Hague
Association football midfielders
ADO Den Haag players